The English League North was the top-flight ice hockey league in northern England from 1978, when it alongside the English League South it replaced the Southern League.  In 1982, it was replaced by the British Hockey League, running on a national basis. Between 1978 and 1981 the league had been named the Southern League (Midland).

Champions
1978/79: Sheffield Lancers
1979/80: Liverpool Leopards
1980/81: Blackpool Seagulls
1981/82: Blackpool Seagulls

 
Defunct ice hockey leagues in the United Kingdom
Sports leagues established in 1978
1978 establishments in England
1982 disestablishments in England